Greenwood, Kentucky, may refer to:

 Greenwood, Louisville, a neighborhood
 Erlanger, Kentucky, previously known as Greenwood
Greenwood, Pendleton County, Kentucky